Chamara (Sinhala: චාමර) is a Sinhalese name that may refer to the following notable people:
Given name
Chamara Dunusinghe (born 1970), Sri Lankan cricketer
Chamara Fernando (born 1988), Sri Lankan cricketer
Chamara Janaraj Peiris (born 1970), Sri Lankan journalist, screenplay writer, television director and filmmaker
Chamara Kapugedera (born 1987), Sri Lankan cricketer
Chamara Lasantha (born 1981), Sri Lankan cricketer
Chamara Repiyallage (born 1992), Sri Lankan judoka
Chamara Sampath Dassanayake, Sri Lankan politician 
Chamara Silva (born 1979), Sri Lankan cricketer
Chamara de Soysa (born 1978), Sri Lankan cricketer

Surname
Hashan Chamara (born 1995), Sri Lankan cricketer
Iresh Chamara (born 1994), Sri Lankan cricketer
Nuwan Chamara (born 1983), Sri Lankan cricketer

See also
 Fly-whisk, also known as chāmara
Cāmara yoga

Sinhalese masculine given names
Sinhalese surnames